Heroin, also known as diacetylmorphine and diamorphine among other names, is a potent opioid mainly used as a recreational drug for its euphoric effects. Medical grade diamorphine is used as a pure hydrochloride salt. Various white and brown powders sold illegally around the world as heroin are routinely diluted with cutting agents. Black tar heroin is a variable admixture of morphine derivatives—predominantly 6-MAM (6-monoacetylmorphine), which is the result of crude acetylation during clandestine production of street heroin. Heroin is used medically in several countries to relieve pain, such as during childbirth or a heart attack, as well as in opioid replacement therapy.

It is typically injected, usually into a vein, but it can also be snorted, smoked, or inhaled. In a clinical context, the route of administration is most commonly intravenous injection; it may also be given by intramuscular or subcutaneous injection, as well as orally in the form of tablets. The onset of effects is usually rapid and lasts for a few hours.

Common side effects include respiratory depression (decreased breathing), dry mouth, drowsiness, impaired mental function, constipation, and addiction. Use by injection can also result in abscesses, infected heart valves, blood-borne infections, and pneumonia. After a history of long-term use, opioid withdrawal symptoms can begin within hours of the last use. When given by injection into a vein, heroin has two to three times the effect of a similar dose of morphine. It typically appears in the form of a white or brown powder.

Treatment of heroin addiction often includes behavioral therapy and medications. Medications can include buprenorphine, methadone, or naltrexone. A heroin overdose may be treated with naloxone. An estimated 17 million people  use opiates, of which heroin is the most common, and opioid use resulted in 122,000 deaths. The total number of heroin users worldwide as of 2015 is believed to have increased in Africa, the Americas, and Asia since 2000. In the United States, approximately 1.6 percent of people have used heroin at some point. When people die from overdosing on a drug, the drug is usually an opioid and often heroin.

Heroin was first made by C. R. Alder Wright in 1874 from morphine, a natural product of the opium poppy. Internationally, heroin is controlled under Schedules I and IV of the Single Convention on Narcotic Drugs, and it is generally illegal to make, possess, or sell without a license. About 448 tons of heroin were made in 2016. In 2015, Afghanistan produced about 66% of the world's opium. Illegal heroin is often mixed with other substances such as sugar, starch, caffeine, quinine, or other opioids like fentanyl.

Uses

Recreational

Bayer's original trade name of heroin is typically used in non-medical settings. It is used as a recreational drug for the euphoria it induces. Anthropologist Michael Agar once described heroin as "the perfect whatever drug." Tolerance develops quickly, and increased doses are needed in order to achieve the same effects. Its popularity with recreational drug users, compared to morphine, reportedly stems from its perceived different effects.

Short-term addiction studies by the same researchers demonstrated that tolerance developed at a similar rate to both heroin and morphine. When compared to the opioids hydromorphone, fentanyl, oxycodone, and pethidine (meperidine), former addicts showed a strong preference for heroin and morphine, suggesting that heroin and morphine are particularly susceptible to misuse and causing dependence. Morphine and heroin were also much more likely to produce euphoria and other "positive" subjective effects when compared to these other opioids.

Medical uses
In the United States, heroin is not accepted as medically useful.

Under the generic name diamorphine, heroin is prescribed as a strong pain medication in the United Kingdom, where it is administered via oral, subcutaneous, intramuscular, intrathecal, intranasal or intravenous routes. It may be prescribed for the treatment of acute pain, such as in severe physical trauma, myocardial infarction, post-surgical pain and chronic pain, including end-stage terminal illnesses. In other countries it is more common to use morphine or other strong opioids in these situations. In 2004, the National Institute for Health and Clinical Excellence produced guidance on the management of caesarean section, which recommended the use of intrathecal or epidural diamorphine for post-operative pain relief. For women who have had intrathecal opioids, there should be a minimum hourly observation of respiratory rate, sedation and pain scores for at least 12 hours for diamorphine and 24 hours for morphine. Women should be offered diamorphine (0.3–0.4 mg intrathecally) for intra- and postoperative analgesia because it reduces the need for supplemental analgesia after a caesarean section. Epidural diamorphine (2.5–5 mg) is a suitable alternative.

Diamorphine continues to be widely used in palliative care in the UK, where it is commonly given by the subcutaneous route, often via a syringe driver if patients cannot easily swallow morphine solution. The advantage of diamorphine over morphine is that diamorphine is more fat soluble and therefore more potent by injection, so smaller doses of it are needed for the same effect on pain. Both of these factors are advantageous if giving high doses of opioids via the subcutaneous route, which is often necessary for palliative care.

It is also used in the palliative management of bone fractures and other trauma, especially in children. In the trauma context, it is primarily given by nose in hospital; although a prepared nasal spray is available. It has traditionally been made by the attending physician, generally from the same "dry" ampoules as used for injection. In children, Ayendi nasal spray is available at 720 micrograms and 1600 micrograms per 50 microlitres actuation of the spray, which may be preferable as a non-invasive alternative in pediatric care, avoiding the fear of injection in children.

Maintenance therapy

A number of European countries prescribe heroin for treatment of heroin addiction. The initial Swiss HAT (Heroin-assisted treatment) trial ("PROVE" study) was conducted as a prospective cohort study with some 1,000 participants in 18 treatment centers between 1994 and 1996, at the end of 2004, 1,200 patients were enrolled in HAT in 23 treatment centers across Switzerland. Diamorphine may be used as a maintenance drug to assist the treatment of opiate addiction, normally in long-term chronic intravenous (IV) heroin users. It is only prescribed following exhaustive efforts at treatment via other means. It is sometimes thought that heroin users can walk into a clinic and walk out with a prescription, but the process takes many weeks before a prescription for diamorphine is issued. Though this is somewhat controversial among proponents of a zero-tolerance drug policy, it has proven superior to methadone in improving the social and health situations of addicts.

The UK Department of Health's Rolleston Committee Report in 1926 established the British approach to diamorphine prescription to users, which was maintained for the next 40 years: dealers were prosecuted, but doctors could prescribe diamorphine to users when withdrawing. In 1964, the Brain Committee recommended that only selected approved doctors working at approved specialized centres be allowed to prescribe diamorphine and cocaine to users. The law was made more restrictive in 1968. Beginning in the 1970s, the emphasis shifted to abstinence and the use of methadone; currently, only a small number of users in the UK are prescribed diamorphine.

In 1994, Switzerland began a trial diamorphine maintenance program for users that had failed multiple withdrawal programs. The aim of this program was to maintain the health of the user by avoiding medical problems stemming from the illicit use of diamorphine. The first trial in 1994 involved 340 users, although enrollment was later expanded to 1000, based on the apparent success of the program. The trials proved diamorphine maintenance to be superior to other forms of treatment in improving the social and health situation for this group of patients. It has also been shown to save money, despite high treatment expenses, as it significantly reduces costs incurred by trials, incarceration, health interventions and delinquency. Patients appear twice daily at a treatment center, where they inject their dose of diamorphine under the supervision of medical staff. They are required to contribute about 450 Swiss francs per month to the treatment costs. A national referendum in November 2008 showed 68% of voters supported the plan, introducing diamorphine prescription into federal law. The previous trials were based on time-limited executive ordinances. The success of the Swiss trials led German, Dutch, and Canadian cities to try out their own diamorphine prescription programs. Some Australian cities (such as Sydney) have instituted legal diamorphine supervised injecting centers, in line with other wider harm minimization programs.

Since January 2009, Denmark has prescribed diamorphine to a few addicts who have tried methadone and buprenorphine without success. Beginning in February 2010, addicts in Copenhagen and Odense became eligible to receive free diamorphine. Later in 2010, other cities including Århus and Esbjerg joined the scheme. It was estimated that around 230 addicts would be able to receive free diamorphine.

However, Danish addicts would only be able to inject heroin according to the policy set by Danish National Board of Health. Of the estimated 1500 drug users who did not benefit from the then-current oral substitution treatment, approximately 900 would not be in the target group for treatment with injectable diamorphine, either because of "massive multiple drug abuse of non-opioids" or "not wanting treatment with injectable diamorphine".

In July 2009, the German Bundestag passed a law allowing diamorphine prescription as a standard treatment for addicts; a large-scale trial of diamorphine prescription had been authorized in the country in 2002.

On 26 August 2016, Health Canada issued regulations amending prior regulations it had issued under the Controlled Drugs and Substances Act; the "New Classes of Practitioners Regulations", the "Narcotic Control Regulations", and the "Food and Drug Regulations", to allow doctors to prescribe diamorphine to people who have a severe opioid addiction who have not responded to other treatments. The prescription heroin can be accessed by doctors through Health Canada's Special Access Programme (SAP) for "emergency access to drugs for patients with serious or life-threatening conditions when conventional treatments have failed, are unsuitable, or are unavailable."

Routes of administration

The onset of heroin's effects depends upon the route of administration. Smoking is the fastest route of drug administration, although intravenous injection results in a quicker rise in blood concentration. These are followed by suppository (anal or vaginal insertion), insufflation (snorting), and ingestion (swallowing).

A 2002 study suggests that a fast onset of action increases the reinforcing effects of addictive drugs. Ingestion does not produce a rush as a forerunner to the high experienced with the use of heroin, which is most pronounced with intravenous use. While the onset of the rush induced by injection can occur in as little as a few seconds, the oral route of administration requires approximately half an hour before the high sets in. Thus, with both higher the dosage of heroin used and faster the route of administration used, the higher the potential risk for psychological dependence/addiction.

Large doses of heroin can cause fatal respiratory depression, and the drug has been used for suicide or as a murder weapon. The serial killer Harold Shipman used diamorphine on his victims, and the subsequent Shipman Inquiry led to a tightening of the regulations surrounding the storage, prescribing and destruction of controlled drugs in the UK.

Because significant tolerance to respiratory depression develops quickly with continued use and is lost just as quickly during withdrawal, it is often difficult to determine whether a heroin lethal overdose was accidental, suicide or homicide. Examples include the overdose deaths of Sid Vicious, Janis Joplin, Tim Buckley, Hillel Slovak, Layne Staley, Bradley Nowell, Ted Binion, and River Phoenix.

By mouth
Use of heroin by mouth is less common than other methods of administration, mainly because there is little to no "rush", and the effects are less potent. Heroin is entirely converted to morphine by means of first-pass metabolism, resulting in deacetylation when ingested. Heroin's oral bioavailability is both dose-dependent (as is morphine's) and significantly higher than oral use of morphine itself, reaching up to 64.2% for high doses and 45.6% for low doses; opiate-naive users showed far less absorption of the drug at low doses, having bioavailabilities of only up to 22.9%. The maximum plasma concentration of morphine following oral administration of heroin was around twice as much as that of oral morphine.

Injection
Injection, also known as "slamming", "banging", "shooting up", "digging" or "mainlining", is a popular method which carries relatively greater risks than other methods of administration. Heroin base (commonly found in Europe), when prepared for injection, will only dissolve in water when mixed with an acid (most commonly citric acid powder or lemon juice) and heated. Heroin in the east-coast United States is most commonly found in the hydrochloride salt form, requiring just water (and no heat) to dissolve. Users tend to initially inject in the easily accessible arm veins, but as these veins collapse over time, users resort to more dangerous areas of the body, such as the femoral vein in the groin. Some medical professionals have expressed concern over this route of administration, as they suspect that it can lead to deep vein thrombosis.

Intravenous users can use a various single dose range using a hypodermic needle. The dose of heroin used for recreational purposes is dependent on the frequency and level of use: thus, a first-time user may use between 5 and 20 mg, while an established addict may require several hundred mg per day.

As with the injection of any drug, if a group of users share a common needle without sterilization procedures, blood-borne diseases, such as HIV/AIDS or hepatitis, can be transmitted.
The use of a common dispenser for water for the use in the preparation of the injection, as well as the sharing of spoons and filters can also cause the spread of blood-borne diseases. Many countries now supply small sterile spoons and filters for single use in order to prevent the spread of disease.

Smoking
Smoking heroin refers to vaporizing it to inhale the resulting fumes, rather than burning and inhaling the smoke. It is commonly smoked in glass pipes made from glassblown Pyrex tubes and light bulbs. Heroin may be smoked from aluminium foil, that is heated by a flame underneath it, with the resulting smoke inhaled through a tube of rolled up foil, a method also known as "chasing the dragon".

Insufflation
Another popular route to intake heroin is insufflation (snorting), where a user crushes the heroin into a fine powder and then gently inhales it (sometimes with a straw or a rolled-up banknote, as with cocaine) into the nose, where heroin is absorbed through the soft tissue in the mucous membrane of the sinus cavity and straight into the bloodstream. This method of administration redirects first-pass metabolism, with a quicker onset and higher bioavailability than oral administration, though the duration of action is shortened. This method is sometimes preferred by users who do not want to prepare and administer heroin for injection or smoking but still experience a fast onset. Snorting heroin becomes an often unwanted route, once a user begins to inject the drug. The user may still get high on the drug from snorting, and experience a nod, but will not get a rush. A "rush" is caused by a large amount of heroin entering the body at once. When the drug is taken in through the nose, the user does not get the rush because the drug is absorbed slowly rather than instantly.

Heroin for pain has been mixed with sterile water on site by the attending physician, and administered using a syringe with a nebulizer tip. Heroin may be used for fractures, burns, finger-tip injuries, suturing, and wound re-dressing, but is inappropriate in head injuries.

Suppository
Little research has been focused on the suppository (anal insertion) or pessary (vaginal insertion) methods of administration, also known as "plugging". These methods of administration are commonly carried out using an oral syringe. Heroin can be dissolved and withdrawn into an oral syringe which may then be lubricated and inserted into the anus or vagina before the plunger is pushed. The rectum or the vaginal canal is where the majority of the drug would likely be taken up, through the membranes lining their walls.

Adverse effects

Heroin is classified as a hard drug in terms of drug harmfulness. Like most opioids, unadulterated heroin may lead to adverse effects. The purity of street heroin varies greatly, leading to overdoses when the purity is higher than expected.

Short term effects 

Users report an intense rush, an acute transcendent state of euphoria, which occurs while diamorphine is being metabolized into 6-monoacetylmorphine (6-MAM) and morphine in the brain. Some believe that heroin produces more euphoria than other opioids; one possible explanation is the presence of 6-monoacetylmorphine, a metabolite unique to heroin – although a more likely explanation is the rapidity of onset. While other opioids of recreational use produce only morphine, heroin also leaves 6-MAM, also a psycho-active metabolite.

However, this perception is not supported by the results of clinical studies comparing the physiological and subjective effects of injected heroin and morphine in individuals formerly addicted to opioids; these subjects showed no preference for one drug over the other. Equipotent injected doses had comparable action courses, with no difference in subjects' self-rated feelings of euphoria, ambition, nervousness, relaxation, drowsiness, or sleepiness.

The rush is usually accompanied by a warm flushing of the skin, dry mouth, and a heavy feeling in the extremities. Nausea, vomiting, and severe itching may also occur. After the initial effects, users usually will be drowsy for several hours; mental function is clouded; heart function slows, and breathing is also severely slowed, sometimes enough to be life-threatening. Slowed breathing can also lead to coma and permanent brain damage. Heroin use has also been associated with myocardial infarction.

Long term effects 

Repeated heroin use changes the physical structure and physiology of the brain, creating long-term imbalances in neuronal and hormonal systems that are not easily reversed. Studies have shown some deterioration of the brain's white matter due to heroin use, which may affect decision-making abilities, the ability to regulate behavior, and responses to stressful situations. Heroin also produces profound degrees of tolerance and physical dependence. Tolerance occurs when more and more of the drug is required to achieve the same effects. With physical dependence, the body adapts to the presence of the drug, and withdrawal symptoms occur if use is reduced abruptly.

Injection 
Intravenous use of heroin (and any other substance) with needles and syringes or other related equipment may lead to:

 Contracting blood-borne pathogens such as HIV and hepatitis via the sharing of needles
 Contracting bacterial or fungal endocarditis and possibly venous sclerosis
Abscesses
 Poisoning from contaminants added to "cut" or dilute heroin
Decreased kidney function (nephropathy), although it is not currently known if this is because of adulterants or infectious diseases

Withdrawal

The withdrawal syndrome from heroin may begin within as little as two hours of discontinuation of the drug; however, this time frame can fluctuate with the degree of tolerance as well as the amount of the last consumed dose, and more typically begins within 6–24 hours after cessation. Symptoms may include sweating, malaise, anxiety, depression, akathisia, priapism, extra sensitivity of the genitals in females, general feeling of heaviness, excessive yawning or sneezing, rhinorrhea, insomnia, cold sweats, chills, severe muscle and bone aches, nausea, vomiting, diarrhea, cramps, watery eyes, fever, cramp-like pains, and involuntary spasms in the limbs (thought to be an origin of the term "kicking the habit").

Overdose

Heroin overdose is usually treated with the opioid antagonist naloxone. This reverses the effects of heroin and causes an immediate return of consciousness but may result in withdrawal symptoms. The half-life of naloxone is shorter than some opioids, such that it may need to be given multiple times until the opioid has been metabolized by the body.

Between 2012 and 2015, heroin was the leading cause of drug related deaths in the United States. Since then fentanyl has been a more common cause of drug related deaths.

Depending on drug interactions and numerous other factors, death from overdose can take anywhere from several minutes to several hours. Death usually occurs due to lack of oxygen resulting from the lack of breathing caused by the opioid. Heroin overdoses can occur because of an unexpected increase in the dose or purity or because of diminished opioid tolerance. However, many fatalities reported as overdoses are probably caused by interactions with other depressant drugs such as alcohol or benzodiazepines. Since heroin can cause nausea and vomiting, a significant number of deaths attributed to heroin overdose are caused by aspiration of vomit by an unconscious person. Some sources quote the median lethal dose (for an average 75 kg opiate-naive individual) as being between 75 and 600 mg. Illicit heroin is of widely varying and unpredictable purity. This means that the user may prepare what they consider to be a moderate dose while actually taking far more than intended. Also, tolerance typically decreases after a period of abstinence. If this occurs and the user takes a dose comparable to their previous use, the user may experience drug effects that are much greater than expected, potentially resulting in an overdose. It has been speculated that an unknown portion of heroin-related deaths are the result of an overdose or allergic reaction to quinine, which may sometimes be used as a cutting agent.

Pharmacology

When taken orally, heroin undergoes extensive first-pass metabolism via deacetylation, making it a prodrug for the systemic delivery of morphine. When the drug is injected, however, it avoids this first-pass effect, very rapidly crossing the blood–brain barrier because of the presence of the acetyl groups, which render it much more fat soluble than morphine itself. Once in the brain, it then is deacetylated variously into the inactive 3-monoacetylmorphine and the active 6-monoacetylmorphine (6-MAM), and then to morphine, which bind to μ-opioid receptors, resulting in the drug's euphoric, analgesic (pain relief), and anxiolytic (anti-anxiety) effects; heroin itself exhibits relatively low affinity for the μ receptor. Analgesia follows from the activation of the μ receptor G-protein coupled receptor, which indirectly hyperpolarizes the neuron, reducing the release of nociceptive neurotransmitters, and hence, causes analgesia and increased pain tolerance.

Unlike hydromorphone and oxymorphone, however, administered intravenously, heroin creates a larger histamine release, similar to morphine, resulting in the feeling of a greater subjective "body high" to some, but also instances of pruritus (itching) when they first start using.

Normally GABA, released from inhibitory neurones, inhibits the release of dopamine. Opiates, like heroin and morphine, decrease the inhibitory activity of such neurones. This causes increased release of dopamine in the brain which is the reason for euphoric and rewarding effects of heroin.

Both morphine and 6-MAM are μ-opioid agonists that bind to receptors present throughout the brain, spinal cord, and gut of all mammals. The μ-opioid receptor also binds endogenous opioid peptides such as β-endorphin, Leu-enkephalin, and Met-enkephalin. Repeated use of heroin results in a number of physiological changes, including an increase in the production of μ-opioid receptors (upregulation). These physiological alterations lead to tolerance and dependence, so that stopping heroin use results in uncomfortable symptoms including pain, anxiety, muscle spasms, and insomnia called the opioid withdrawal syndrome. Depending on usage it has an onset 4–24 hours after the last dose of heroin. Morphine also binds to δ- and κ-opioid receptors.

There is also evidence that 6-MAM binds to a subtype of μ-opioid receptors that are also activated by the morphine metabolite morphine-6β-glucuronide but not morphine itself. The third subtype of third opioid type is the mu-3 receptor, which may be a commonality to other six-position monoesters of morphine. The contribution of these receptors to the overall pharmacology of heroin remains unknown.

A subclass of morphine derivatives, namely the 3,6 esters of morphine, with similar effects and uses, includes the clinically used strong analgesics nicomorphine (Vilan), and dipropanoylmorphine; there is also the latter's dihydromorphine analogue, diacetyldihydromorphine (Paralaudin). Two other 3,6 diesters of morphine invented in 1874–75 along with diamorphine, dibenzoylmorphine and acetylpropionylmorphine, were made as substitutes after it was outlawed in 1925 and, therefore, sold as the first "designer drugs" until they were outlawed by the League of Nations in 1930.

Chemistry
Diamorphine is produced from acetylation of morphine derived from natural opium sources, generally using acetic anhydride.

The major metabolites of diamorphine, 6-MAM, morphine, morphine-3-glucuronide, and morphine-6-glucuronide, may be quantitated in blood, plasma or urine to monitor for use, confirm a diagnosis of poisoning, or assist in a medicolegal death investigation. Most commercial opiate screening tests cross-react appreciably with these metabolites, as well as with other biotransformation products likely to be present following usage of street-grade diamorphine such as 6-Monoacetylcodeine and codeine. However, chromatographic techniques can easily distinguish and measure each of these substances. When interpreting the results of a test, it is important to consider the diamorphine usage history of the individual, since a chronic user can develop tolerance to doses that would incapacitate an opiate-naive individual, and the chronic user often has high baseline values of these metabolites in his system. Furthermore, some testing procedures employ a hydrolysis step before quantitation that converts many of the metabolic products to morphine, yielding a result that may be 2 times larger than with a method that examines each product individually.

History

The opium poppy was cultivated in lower Mesopotamia as long ago as 3400 BC. The chemical analysis of opium in the 19th century revealed that most of its activity could be ascribed to the alkaloids codeine and morphine.

Diamorphine was first synthesized in 1874 by C. R. Alder Wright, an English chemist working at St. Mary's Hospital Medical School in London who had been experimenting combining morphine with various acids. He boiled anhydrous morphine alkaloid with acetic anhydride for several hours and produced a more potent, acetylated form of morphine which is now called diacetylmorphine or morphine diacetate. He sent the compound to F. M. Pierce of Owens College in Manchester for analysis. Pierce told Wright:

Wright's invention did not lead to any further developments, and diamorphine became popular only after it was independently re-synthesized 23 years later by chemist Felix Hoffmann. Hoffmann was working at Bayer pharmaceutical company in Elberfeld, Germany, and his supervisor Heinrich Dreser instructed him to acetylate morphine with the objective of producing codeine, a constituent of the opium poppy that is pharmacologically similar to morphine but less potent and less addictive. Instead, the experiment produced an acetylated form of morphine one and a half to two times more potent than morphine itself. Hoffmann synthesized heroin on August 21, 1897, just eleven days after he had synthesized aspirin.

The head of Bayer's research department reputedly coined the drug's new name of "heroin", based on the German heroisch which means "heroic, strong" (from the ancient Greek word "heros, ήρως"). Bayer scientists were not the first to make heroin, but their scientists discovered ways to make it, and Bayer led the commercialization of heroin.

Bayer marketed diacetylmorphine as an over-the-counter drug under the trademark name Heroin. It was developed chiefly as a morphine substitute for cough suppressants that did not have morphine's addictive side-effects. Morphine at the time was a popular recreational drug, and Bayer wished to find a similar but non-addictive substitute to market. However, contrary to Bayer's advertising as a "non-addictive morphine substitute", heroin would soon have one of the highest rates of addiction among its users.

From 1898 through to 1910, diamorphine was marketed under the trademark name Heroin as a non-addictive morphine substitute and cough suppressant. In the 11th edition of Encyclopædia Britannica (1910), the article on morphine states: "In the cough of phthisis minute doses [of morphine] are of service, but in this particular disease morphine is frequently better replaced by codeine or by heroin, which checks irritable coughs without the narcotism following upon the administration of morphine."

In the US, the Harrison Narcotics Tax Act was passed in 1914 to control the sale and distribution of diacetylmorphine and other opioids, which allowed the drug to be prescribed and sold for medical purposes. In 1924, the United States Congress banned its sale, importation, or manufacture. It is now a Schedule I substance, which makes it illegal for non-medical use in signatory nations of the Single Convention on Narcotic Drugs treaty, including the United States.

The Health Committee of the League of Nations banned diacetylmorphine in 1925, although it took more than three years for this to be implemented. In the meantime, the first designer drugs, viz. 3,6 diesters and 6 monoesters of morphine and acetylated analogues of closely related drugs like hydromorphone and dihydromorphine, were produced in massive quantities to fill the worldwide demand for diacetylmorphine—this continued until 1930 when the Committee banned diacetylmorphine analogues with no therapeutic advantage over drugs already in use, the first major legislation of this type.

Bayer lost some of its trademark rights to heroin (as well as aspirin) under the 1919 Treaty of Versailles following the German defeat in World War I.

Use of heroin by jazz musicians in particular was prevalent in the mid-twentieth century, including Billie Holiday, saxophonists Charlie Parker and Art Pepper, guitarist Joe Pass and piano player/singer Ray Charles; a "staggering number of jazz musicians were addicts". It was also a problem with many rock musicians, particularly from the late 1960s through the 1990s. Pete Doherty is also a self-confessed user of heroin. Nirvana lead singer Kurt Cobain's heroin addiction was well documented. Pantera frontman, Phil Anselmo, turned to heroin while touring during the 1990s to cope with his back pain. James Taylor, Jimmy Page, John Lennon, Eric Clapton, Johnny Winter, Keith Richards and Janis Joplin also used heroin. Many musicians have made songs referencing their heroin usage.

Society and culture

Names
"Diamorphine" is the Recommended International Nonproprietary Name and British Approved Name. Other synonyms for heroin include: diacetylmorphine, and morphine diacetate. Heroin is also known by many street names including dope, H, smack, junk, horse, scag, and brown, among others.

Legal status

Asia
In Hong Kong, diamorphine is regulated under Schedule 1 of Hong Kong's Chapter 134 Dangerous Drugs Ordinance. It is available by prescription. Anyone supplying diamorphine without a valid prescription can be fined $5,000,000 (HKD) and imprisoned for life. The penalty for trafficking or manufacturing diamorphine is a $5,000,000 (HKD) fine and life imprisonment. Possession of diamorphine without a license from the Department of Health is illegal with a $1,000,000 (HKD) fine and 7 years of jail time.

Europe
In the Netherlands, diamorphine is a List I drug of the Opium Law. It is available for prescription under tight regulation exclusively to long-term addicts for whom methadone maintenance treatment has failed. It cannot be used to treat severe pain or other illnesses.

In the United Kingdom, diamorphine is available by prescription, though it is a restricted Class A drug. According to the 50th edition of the British National Formulary (BNF), diamorphine hydrochloride may be used in the treatment of acute pain, myocardial infarction, acute pulmonary oedema, and chronic pain. The treatment of chronic non-malignant pain must be supervised by a specialist. The BNF notes that all opioid analgesics cause dependence and tolerance but that this is "no deterrent in the control of pain in terminal illness". When used in the palliative care of cancer patients, diamorphine is often injected using a syringe driver.

In Switzerland, heroin is produced in injectable or tablet form under the name Diaphin by a private company under contract to the Swiss government. Swiss-produced heroin has been imported into Canada with government approval.

Australia
In Australia, diamorphine is listed as a schedule 9 prohibited substance under the Poisons Standard (October 2015). A schedule 9 drug is outlined in the Poisons Act 1964 as "Substances which may be abused or misused, the manufacture, possession, sale or use of which should be prohibited by law except when required for medical or scientific research, or for analytical, teaching or training purposes with approval of the CEO."

North America
In Canada, diamorphine is a controlled substance under Schedule I of the Controlled Drugs and Substances Act (CDSA). Any person seeking or obtaining diamorphine without disclosing authorization 30 days before obtaining another prescription from a practitioner is guilty of an indictable offense and subject to imprisonment for a term not exceeding seven years. Possession of diamorphine for the purpose of trafficking is an indictable offense and subject to imprisonment for life.

In the United States, diamorphine is a Schedule I drug according to the Controlled Substances Act of 1970, making it illegal to possess without a DEA license. Possession of more than 100 grams of diamorphine or a mixture containing diamorphine is punishable with a minimum mandatory sentence of 5 years of imprisonment in a federal prison.

In 2021, the US state of Oregon became the first state to decriminalize the use of heroin after voters passed Ballot Measure 110 in 2020. This measure will allow people with small amounts to avoid arrest.

Turkey

Turkey maintains strict laws against the use, possession or trafficking of illegal drugs. If convicted under these offences, one could receive a heavy fine or a prison sentence of 4 to 24 years.

Misuse of prescription medication
Misused prescription medicine, such as opioids, can lead to heroin use and dependence. The number of death from illegal opioid overdose follows the increasing number of death caused by prescription opioid overdoses. Prescription opioids are relatively easy to obtain. This may ultimately lead to heroin injection because heroin is cheaper than prescribed pills.

Economics

Production
Diamorphine is produced from acetylation of morphine derived from natural opium sources. One such method of heroin production involves isolation of the water-soluble components of raw opium, including morphine, in a strongly basic aqueous solution, followed by recrystallization of the morphine base by addition of ammonium chloride. The solid morphine base is then filtered out. The morphine base is then reacted with acetic anhydride, which forms heroin. This highly impure brown heroin base may then undergo further purification steps, which produces a white-colored product; the final products have a different appearance depending on purity and have different names. Heroin purity has been classified into four grades. No.4 is the purest form – white powder (salt) to be easily dissolved and injected. No.3 is "brown sugar" for smoking (base). No.1 and No.2 are unprocessed raw heroin (salt or base).

Trafficking

Traffic is heavy worldwide, with the biggest producer being Afghanistan. According to a U.N. sponsored survey, in 2004, Afghanistan accounted for production of 87 percent of the world's diamorphine. Afghan opium kills around 100,000 people annually.

In 2003 The Independent reported:

Opium production in that country has increased rapidly since, reaching an all-time high in 2006. War in Afghanistan once again appeared as a facilitator of the trade. Some 3.3 million Afghans are involved in producing opium.

At present, opium poppies are mostly grown in Afghanistan, and in Southeast Asia, especially in the region known as the Golden Triangle straddling Burma, Thailand, Vietnam, Laos and Yunnan province in China. There is also cultivation of opium poppies in Pakistan, Mexico and in Colombia. According to the DEA, the majority of the heroin consumed in the United States comes from Mexico (50%) and Colombia (43–45%) via Mexican criminal cartels such as Sinaloa Cartel. However, these statistics may be significantly unreliable, the DEA's 50/50 split between Colombia and Mexico is contradicted by the amount of hectares cultivated in each country and in 2014, the DEA claimed most of the heroin in the US came from Colombia.
, the Sinaloa Cartel is the most active drug cartel involved in smuggling illicit drugs such as heroin into the United States and trafficking them throughout the United States. According to the Royal Canadian Mounted Police, 90% of the heroin seized in Canada (where the origin was known) came from Afghanistan. Pakistan is the destination and transit point for 40 percent of the opiates produced in Afghanistan, other destinations of Afghan opiates are Russia, Europe and Iran.

A conviction for trafficking heroin carries the death penalty in most Southeast Asian, some East Asian and Middle Eastern countries (see Use of death penalty worldwide for details), among which Malaysia, Singapore and Thailand are the strictest. The penalty applies even to citizens of countries where the penalty is not in place, sometimes causing controversy when foreign visitors are arrested for trafficking, for example, the arrest of nine Australians in Bali, the death sentence given to Nola Blake in Thailand in 1987, or the hanging of an Australian citizen Van Tuong Nguyen in Singapore.

Trafficking history

The origins of the present international illegal heroin trade can be traced back to laws passed in many countries in the early 1900s that closely regulated the production and sale of opium and its derivatives including heroin. At first, heroin flowed from countries where it was still legal into countries where it was no longer legal. By the mid-1920s, heroin production had been made illegal in many parts of the world. An illegal trade developed at that time between heroin labs in China (mostly in Shanghai and Tianjin) and other nations. The weakness of the government in China and conditions of civil war enabled heroin production to take root there. Chinese triad gangs eventually came to play a major role in the illicit heroin trade. The French Connection route started in the 1930s.

Heroin trafficking was virtually eliminated in the US during World War II because of temporary trade disruptions caused by the war. Japan's war with China had cut the normal distribution routes for heroin and the war had generally disrupted the movement of opium. After World War II, the Mafia took advantage of the weakness of the postwar Italian government and set up heroin labs in Sicily which was located along the historic route opium took westward into Europe and the United States. Large-scale international heroin production effectively ended in China with the victory of the communists in the civil war in the late 1940s. The elimination of Chinese production happened at the same time that Sicily's role in the trade developed.

Although it remained legal in some countries until after World War II, health risks, addiction, and widespread recreational use led most western countries to declare heroin a controlled substance by the latter half of the 20th century. In the late 1960s and early 1970s, the CIA supported anti-Communist Chinese Nationalists settled near the Sino-Burmese border and Hmong tribesmen in Laos. This helped the development of the Golden Triangle opium production region, which supplied about one-third of heroin consumed in the US after the 1973 American withdrawal from Vietnam. In 1999, Burma, the heartland of the Golden Triangle, was the second-largest producer of heroin, after Afghanistan.

The Soviet-Afghan war led to increased production in the Pakistani-Afghan border regions, as US-backed mujaheddin militants raised money for arms from selling opium, contributing heavily to the modern Golden Crescent creation. By 1980, 60 percent of the heroin sold in the US originated in Afghanistan. It increased international production of heroin at lower prices in the 1980s. The trade shifted away from Sicily in the late 1970s as various criminal organizations violently fought with each other over the trade. The fighting also led to a stepped-up government law enforcement presence in Sicily.

Following the discovery at a Jordanian airport of a toner cartridge that had been modified into an improvised explosive device, the resultant increased level of airfreight scrutiny led to a major shortage (drought) of heroin from October 2010 until April 2011. This was reported in most of mainland Europe and the UK which led to a price increase of approximately 30 percent in the cost of street heroin and increased demand for diverted methadone. The number of addicts seeking treatment also increased significantly during this period. Other heroin droughts (shortages) have been attributed to cartels restricting supply in order to force a price increase and also to a fungus that attacked the opium crop of 2009. Many people thought that the American government had introduced pathogens into the Afghanistan atmosphere in order to destroy the opium crop and thus starve insurgents of income.

On 13 March 2012, Haji Bagcho, with ties to the Taliban, was convicted by a US District Court of conspiracy, distribution of heroin for importation into the United States and narco-terrorism. Based on heroin production statistics compiled by the United Nations Office on Drugs and Crime, in 2006, Bagcho's activities accounted for approximately 20 percent of the world's total production for that year.

Street price
The European Monitoring Centre for Drugs and Drug Addiction reports that the retail price of brown heroin varies from €14.5 per gram in Turkey to €110 per gram in Sweden, with most European countries reporting typical prices of €35–40 per gram. The price of white heroin is reported only by a few European countries and ranged between €27 and €110 per gram.

The United Nations Office on Drugs and Crime claims in its 2008 World Drug Report that typical US retail prices are US$172 per gram.

Harm reduction

Harm reduction is a public health philosophy that seeks to reduce the harms associated with the use of illicit drugs. One aspect of harm reduction initiatives focuses on the behaviour of individual users. In the case of diamorphine, this includes promoting safer means of taking the drug, such as smoking, nasal use, oral or rectal insertion. This attempts to avoid the higher risks of overdose, infections, and blood-borne viruses associated with injecting the drug. Other measures include using a small amount of the drug first to gauge the strength and minimize the risks of overdose. For the same reason, poly drug use (the use of two or more drugs at the same time) is discouraged. Injecting diamorphine users are encouraged to use new needles, syringes, spoons/steri-cups, and filters every time they inject and not share these with other users. Users are also encouraged to not use it on their own, as others can assist in the event of an overdose.

Governments that support a harm reduction approach usually fund needle and syringe exchange programs, which supply new needles and syringes on a confidential basis, as well as education on proper filtering before injection, safer injection techniques, safe disposal of used injecting gear and other equipment used when preparing diamorphine for injection may also be supplied including citric acid sachets/vitamin C sachets, steri-cups, filters, alcohol pre-injection swabs, sterile water ampules and tourniquets (to stop the use of shoelaces or belts).

Another harm reduction measure employed for example in Europe, Canada, and Australia are safe injection sites where users can inject diamorphine and cocaine under the supervision of medically trained staff. Safe injection sites are low threshold and allow social services to approach problem users that would otherwise be hard to reach.
In the UK the Criminal Justice System has a protocol in place that requires that any individual that is arrested and is suspected of having a substance misuse problem be offered the chance to enter a treatment program. This has had the effect of drastically reducing an area's crime rate as individuals arrested for theft in order to supply the funds for their drugs are no longer in the position of having to steal to purchase heroin because they have been placed onto a methadone program, quite often more quickly than would have been possible had they not been arrested. This aspect of harm reduction is seen as being beneficial to both the individual and the community at large, who are then protected from the possible theft of their goods.

During the late 1980s and early 1990s, Swiss authorities ran the ZIPP-AIDS (Zurich Intervention Pilot Project), handing out free syringes in the officially tolerated drug scene in Platzspitz park. In 1994, Zurich started a pilot project using prescription heroin in heroin-assisted treatment (HAT) which allowed users to obtain heroin and inject it under medical supervision. The HAT program proved to be cost-beneficial to society and improve patients overall health and social stability and has since been introduced in multiple European countries.

Research
Researchers are attempting to reproduce the biosynthetic pathway that produces morphine in genetically engineered yeast. In June 2015 the S-reticuline could be produced from sugar and R-reticuline could be converted to morphine, but the intermediate reaction could not be performed.

See also 
 Allegations of CIA drug trafficking
 Cheese (recreational drug)
 The Politics of Heroin in Southeast Asia

References

External links 

 NIDA InfoFacts on Heroin
 ONDCP Drug Facts
 U.S. National Library of Medicine: Drug Information Portal – Heroin
 BBC Article entitled 'When Heroin Was Legal'. References to the United Kingdom and the United States
 Drug-poisoning Deaths Involving Heroin: United States, 2000–2013 U.S. Department of Health and Human Services, Centers for Disease Control and Prevention, National Center for Health Statistics.
 Heroin Trafficking in the United States (2016) by Kristin Finklea, Congressional Research Service.

 
1874 introductions
1898 introductions
Acetate esters
Brands that became generic
British inventions
4,5-Epoxymorphinans
Euphoriants
Morphine
Mu-opioid receptor agonists
Nephrotoxins
Opioids
Phenol ethers
Prodrugs
Semisynthetic opioids
Wikipedia medicine articles ready to translate